The Fiat 500X (Type 334) is a subcompact crossover SUV manufactured and marketed by Stellantis (formerly Fiat Chrysler Automobiles), since its debut at the 2014 Paris Motor Show. Following the 500L, and produced from 2014 (from 2016 model year for US), the 500X is closely related to the Jeep Renegade. Both are manufactured at FCA's SATA Plant in Melfi, Italy.

Specifications
The 500X is based on the Small Wide 4×4 architecture, a platform evolved from the GM Fiat Small platform used for the Fiat Grande Punto and Fiat 500L.

The Fiat 500X is available with several engines with optional all-wheel drive with most. At launch, engines available outside of North America included: one gasoline, the turbocharged 1.4 MultiAir2, and two MultiJet turbodiesels displacing 1.6 and 2.0 litres.

In North America, the Fiat 500X features:
 A 1.4-litre turbocharged four-cylinder engine, with a six-speed manual transmission available only with front-wheel drive.
 A normally aspirated 2.4-litre four-cylinder engine, with a nine-speed automatic with standard front-wheel drive and optional with all-wheel drive.

Engines

Powertrain

Trim levels
In the United States, FCA originally offered the Fiat 500X in Pop, Easy, Lounge, Trekking, and Trekking Plus trim levels — with optional all wheel drive on all but Pop trim level. In Europe, it comes in Pop, Pop Star, Lounge, Cross, Cross Plus and Sport trims, with the all wheel drive available only on the 2.0L Multijet diesel, and the higher powered gasoline versions with automatic gearboxes.

Safety
The 500X has ventilated front disc brakes and solid ones in the rear.

Latin NCAP
The Italian-made 500X in its most basic Latin American configuration with 6 airbags and ESC received 5 stars for adult occupants, 5 stars for toddlers, and Advanced Award from Latin NCAP in 2018.

Euro NCAP
The 500X in its standard European configuration received 4 stars from Euro NCAP in 2015.

IIHS
The Insurance Institute for Highway Safety named the 2016 Fiat 500X small crossover a 2015 Top Safety Pick+, its highest rating.

Sales

Notes

References

External links

500X
2010s cars
Cars introduced in 2014
All-wheel-drive vehicles
Crossover sport utility vehicles
Euro NCAP small MPVs
Latin NCAP small MPVs